Katie Millar (married name Millar-Wirig) is a former beauty pageant contestant who was Miss Utah in 2006 and a top ten finisher in Miss America 2007.

Early life and education
Millar-Wirig was born and raised in Utah. Her parents are Bret and Rita Millar. She graduated high school at age 17, and while attending Brigham Young University for a bachelor's degree in neuroscience, decided to compete in the Miss Utah competition for the opportunity to win a scholarship to support her education.

Pageants
In 2006, Millar-Wirig was crowned Miss Utah, which included a $10,000 scholarship. The focus of her advocacy platform as Miss Utah was support for the Juvenile Diabetes Research Foundation, inspired by a sibling diagnosed with Type 1 diabetes during childhood. 

As a result of her Miss Utah win, she then competed in the Miss America 2007 pageant. During the competition, she became a top ten finalist, which included a swimsuit and evening wear competition. Despite pressure from her designers and sponsors to compromise her core values, she wore a modest gown that she had altered, and a one-piece swimsuit during the competitions.

Filmography

She appeared in a recurring supporting role on the drama television series Everwood and as herself in the reality TV movie Pageant School: Becoming Miss America.

Personal life

Millar-Wirig married Brent Wirig in the Mount Timpanogos Utah Temple on July 14, 2007.

References

1986 births
Latter Day Saints from Utah
Brigham Young University alumni
Living people
People from Highland, Utah
Miss America 2007 delegates